Seal in Red is the eleventh and final studio album by funk band Rufus, their debut on the Warner Bros. Records label, released in 1983. Seal in Red, which was the band's third album to be recorded without Chaka Khan, peaked at #49 on Billboards R&B Albums chart and included the single "Take It to the Top" (US R&B #47).

Despite featuring guest appearances from a host of other distinguished names in the R&B/Soul/Funk/Jazz genres like keyboardist George Duke, who also produced the album, singers Patti Austin and Ivan Neville, Chicago's trombonist James Pankow, and saxophonist Ernie Watts, Seal in Red was only a moderate commercial success.  Following Seal in Red the band reunited with Chaka Khan for one final album together, the double live/studio set Stompin' at the Savoy - Live, before dissolving in late 1983.

Track listing

Personnel
Tony Maiden – vocals, guitar, bass
David "Hawk" Wolinski – vocals, keyboards
John Robinson – drums, keyboards, vocals
Bobby Watson – bass
Kevin Murphy – keyboards, vocals
Ivan Neville – vocals
Additional personnel
George Duke – piano, synthesizer
Patti Austin – vocals
Ernie Watts – saxophone
James Pankow – trombone
Paulinho da Costa – percussion

Production
George Duke – producer
Tommy Vicari – engineer, re-mixing
Brent Averill, Nick Spigel, Steve Schmidt, Peter Chaiken – engineer
Brian Gardner – mastering

ChartsAlbumSingles'''

References

External linksSeal in Read'' at Discogs

1983 albums
Rufus (band) albums
albums produced by George Duke
Warner Records albums